Japanese musician Zentaro Watanabe worked as a composer and an arranger for many pop and rock musicians, outside of his work as a band member of Shijin no Chi, Oh! Penelope and Atami.

Soundtracks

Songs produced for other artists

References 

Production discographies
Discographies of Japanese artists
Pop music discographies
Rock music discographies